The Cincinnati–Newport Bridge, also known as the Central Bridge, was a cantilever bridge which crossed the Ohio River between Newport, Kentucky and Cincinnati, Ohio. It was completed in 1890 and demolished in 1992 to make way for the Taylor-Southgate Bridge, which opened in 1995.

Some pieces of the ornate ironwork were transferred from the Cincinnati–Newport Bridge to the Taylor-Southgate Bridge.

See also
List of bridges documented by the Historic American Engineering Record in Kentucky
List of bridges documented by the Historic American Engineering Record in Ohio
List of crossings of the Ohio River

References

External links

Cincinnati-Newport Bridge cincinnati-transit.net

Bridges over the Ohio River
Bridges in Cincinnati
Former road bridges in the United States
Historic American Engineering Record in Kentucky
Historic American Engineering Record in Ohio
Cantilever bridges in the United States
Truss bridges in the United States
Bridges completed in 1890
Demolished bridges in the United States
Buildings and structures demolished in 1992
Demolished buildings and structures in Ohio
Road bridges in Kentucky
Road bridges in Ohio
1992 disestablishments in Ohio
1992 disestablishments in Kentucky
1890 establishments in Ohio
1890 establishments in Kentucky
Interstate vehicle bridges in the United States
Transportation in Campbell County, Kentucky
Demolished buildings and structures in Kentucky